Highway 38 (AR 38, Ark. 38, and Hwy. 38) is a designation for three state highways in Arkansas. One route of  runs east from Highway 367 at Cabot to US Route 49 (US 49) near Hunter. A second route of  begins at Interstate 40 (I-40) and runs east to Highway 147 near Horseshoe Lake. A third route of  runs in West Memphis as Martin Luther King Jr. Drive from US 70 north to I-55/US 61/US 64/US 79. All routes are maintained by the Arkansas State Highway and Transportation Department (AHTD).

Route description

Cabot to Hunter
Highway 38 begins at US 67 and then intersects Highway 367 at the city limits of Cabot in Lonoke County. The highway connects agricultural areas in Arkansas's Grand Prairie, including rice and soybeans as well as aquaculture. Passing east through Austin, where it has an intersection with Highway 319. The intersection is near the Sears House, an 1860 antebellum home in late Greek Revival-Italianate style listed on the National Register of Historic Places (NRHP). Continuing east, Highway 38 runs through unincorporated area in eastern Lonoke County, intersecting Highway 321 near Sylvania and Highway 31 near Butlerville before entering Prairie County.

Upon entering Prairie County, Highway 38 continues to pass through rural, agricultural areas with small settlements at intersections with other state highways. The highway intersects Highway 13 at Hickory Plains, Highway 86 at Hayley, and Highway 11 at Four Mile Corner. Highway 11 begins a concurrency with Highway 38 eastward toward Des Arc, the county seat for the northern district of Prairie County. Entering Des Arc, Highway 38 and Highway 11 intersect Highway 323 near the Lower White River Museum State Park. Highway 323 runs to the downtown business district, with Highway 38 turning northeast and bypassing most of the city. In northern Des Arc, the concurrency with Highway 11 ends, with Highway 11 turning due north toward the Bayou De View Wildlife Management Area and Searcy. This intersection also contains Highway 323Y, which is a short spur route providing access to downtown Des Arc. Highway 38 continues along the northern edge of Des Arc, passing the historic Oak Grove Cemetery, listed on the NRHP, and crossing over the White River on a 1970 steel through truss bridge. Highway 33 overlaps Highway 38 in eastern Prairie County until the Woodruff County line, when Highway 33 turns north toward Augusta, ending the concurrency.

Running east as a section line road, Highway 38 enters Woodruff County at Little Dixie and runs east to Cotton Plant. Serving as Main Street in Cotton Plant, the highway passes intersects Highway 306 before beginning a short overlap with Highway 17 through historic downtown Cotton Plant. East of the city, Highway 38 briefly dips into Monroe County and crosses Bayou DeView before meeting US 49 at a rural intersection, where the route terminates.

I-40 to Hughes

West Memphis

History

The route from Des Arc to Cotton Plant was originally designated as part of Arkansas State Road B-7 in the original 1924 state highway plan. This route ran north from the Stuttgart area to Cotton Plant via Des Arc, roughly along present-day US 63, Highway 11 and Highway 38. During the 1926 Arkansas state highway numbering, the Highway 38 designation was assigned to the short connector highway between Des Arc and Cotton Plant. The route was extended west to Cabot in the late 1930s. A minor routing change west of Hughes involving a new bridge over Blackfish Bayou occurred in 1956.

Highway 38 was extended east in 1958 following the construction of a new US 79 alignment in Hughes. Highway 38 was extended east, creating an overlap with Highway 50 and terminating at Highway 147 near Horseshoe Lake. The area around Horseshoe Lake with Highway 38 and Highway 147 was renumbered in 1959 "for the convenience and guidance of the traveling public". This rerouting was changed in 1963 to "eliminate confusion" near Horseshoe Lake, resulting in the creation of Highway 131 and rerouting Highway 147.

Major intersections

See also

 List of state highways in Arkansas

Notes

References

External links

038
Transportation in Lonoke County, Arkansas
Transportation in Prairie County, Arkansas
Transportation in Woodruff County, Arkansas
Transportation in St. Francis County, Arkansas
Transportation in Crittenden County, Arkansas
Great River Road